The 4th constituency of the Sarthe is a French legislative constituency in the Sarthe département.

In the 2007 legislative election, the constituency was won by François Fillon. Fillon was appointed Prime Minister, whereupon he automatically lost his seat; in France, a member of the executive cannot simultaneously be a member of the legislature. On July 20, his deputy candidate, Marc Joulaud, who had previously held the seat himself, automatically took Fillon's place in the Assembly.

Historic representation

Election results

2022

 
 
 
 
 
 
 
 
|-
| colspan="8" bgcolor="#E9E9E9"|
|-
 
 

 
 
 
 
 

* PS dissident without the support of the NUPES alliance

2017

 
 
 
 
 
 
 
 
|-
| colspan="8" bgcolor="#E9E9E9"|
|-

2012

 
 
 
 
 
|-
| colspan="8" bgcolor="#E9E9E9"|
|-

2007

Sources & references
 Official results of French elections from 1998: 

4